The 1932 FA Cup final was contested by Newcastle United and Arsenal at Wembley Stadium in what became known as the "Over The Line" final. Newcastle won 2–1, both of their goals scored by Jack Allen.

Arsenal had led 1–0 with a Bob John goal, but Newcastle's equaliser came after a long ball that had appeared to pass over the goal line. Newcastle winger Jimmy Richardson crossed the ball back into the field and Allen levelled the match for the Magpies. The referee ruled that the ball had not gone out of play, but photographic evidence later suggested that the ball had crossed the line; the goal stood. Allen scored again in the second half to win the match 2–1.

Match details

References

External links
Match report at www.fa-cupfinals.co.uk
FA Cup Final lineups

FA Cup Finals
FA Cup Final
FA Cup Final 1932
FA Cup Final 1932
FA Cup Final
FA Cup Final